Lovro Planko (born 28 May 2001) is a Slovenian biathlete. He competed four-times at the Junior World Championships. He represented Slovenia at the 2022 Olympic Games in Beijing, China.

Career
He first competed at Junior World Cup in Pokljuka, Slovenia in 2017. He made a debut in Junior IBU Cup in 2018 in Lenzerheide, Switzerland.

Biathlon results
All results are sourced from the International Biathlon Union.

Olympic Games

Junior/Youth World Championships
3 medals (2 silver, 1 bronze)

References

2001 births
Living people
Slovenian male biathletes
Sportspeople from Ljubljana
Olympic biathletes of Slovenia
Biathletes at the 2022 Winter Olympics
21st-century Slovenian people